Gerasimos Koutsopodiotis (born 10 April 1999) is a Greek professional footballer who plays as a centre-back.

Early life
Koutsopodiotis was born and raised in Vouliagmeni, Athens. He attended Gimnasio, Lower Secondary Education School and graduated from Psychico College in 2017.

Club career

Proodeftiki
Koutsopodiotis joined Proodeftiki  in 2018 on a free transfer.

Lamia
On 20 August 2019, Koutsopodiotis joined Lamia on a three-year deal.

Charavgiakos F.C.
Koutsopodiotis joined Charavgiakos F.C.  on 4 August 2020.

External links
Lamia Official website
Super League Greece Player Profile - Gerasimos Koutsopodiotis

1999 births
Living people
Greece under-21 international footballers
Greece youth international footballers
Association football central defenders
Football League (Greece) players
Super League Greece players
Proodeftiki F.C. players
PAS Lamia 1964 players
Footballers from Athens
Greek footballers